The 2004 Boscastle flood occurred on Monday, 16 August 2004 in the two villages of Boscastle and Crackington Haven in Cornwall, England, United Kingdom. The villages suffered extensive damage after flash floods caused by an exceptional amount of rain that fell over eight hours that afternoon. The flood in Boscastle was filmed and extensively reported but the floods in Crackington Haven and Rocky Valley were not mentioned beyond the local news. The floods were the worst in local memory. A study commissioned by the Environment Agency from hydraulics consulting firm HR Wallingford concluded that it was among the most extreme ever experienced in Britain. The peak flow was about 140 m3/s, between 5:00 pm and 6:00 pm BST. The annual chance of this (or a greater) flood in any one year is about 1 in 400. The probability each year of the heaviest three-hour rainfall is about 1 in 1300 (although rainfall probability is not the same as flood probability). At midday on 16 August 2004, heavy thundery showers had developed across the South West due to a weak disturbance to the northeast of the United Kingdom.

Coincidentally, this was 52 years to the day before Boscastle's 2004 flood.

Causes of the flood

On the 16th, warm air picking up moisture – due to residual heat from the Atlantic Ocean – travelled towards the South West Cornish coast as prevailing winds. Upon contact with the topographically vertical coast, these winds experienced a strong up-drafting force thus causing internal moisture to reach the atmosphere, and consequently cool as a string of storm clouds. With convergence and coalescence, enhanced moisture levels resulted in heavy rainfall on the afternoon of 16 August 2004. 185 mm (7 inches) of rain fell over the high ground just inland of Boscastle. At the peak of the downpour, at about 15:40 GMT, 24.1mm of rain (almost one inch) was recorded as falling in just 15 minutes at Lesnewth,  up the valley from Boscastle. In Boscastle,  of rain was recorded in 60 minutes. The rain was very localised: Otterham and Lesnewth, both a few miles inland from Boscastle, recorded 24 hour totals of 200 mm and 185 mm respectively on the day, whereas four of the nearest 10 rain gauges showed less than 3 mm of rain in the same period. The cause of the very heavy localised rain is thought to be an extreme example of what has become known as the Brown Willy effect.

The torrential rain led to a  rise in river levels in one hour. A  wave, believed to have been triggered by water pooling behind debris caught under a bridge and then being suddenly released as the bridge collapsed, surged down the main road. It is estimated that  of water flowed through Boscastle that day alone. The steep valley sides, and the saturated surface ensured a high amount of surface run-off.

Changes in farming practice in the area also possibly contributed, sewage could have been a cause as well, with a reduction of trees and hedges higher up the valley causing water to flow through more quickly than would have been the case in the past. No one died in the flood.

Impact of the flood
75 cars, 5 caravans, 6 buildings and several boats were washed into the sea; approximately 100 homes and businesses were destroyed, and some had to be demolished; trees were uprooted and debris were scattered over a large area. In an operation lasting from mid-afternoon until 2:30 am, a fleet of 7 Westland Sea King helicopters rescued about 150 people clinging to trees and the roofs of buildings and cars. No major injuries or loss of life were reported. It was widely reported by newspapers at the time that the only (and worst) injury was a broken thumb. The estimated cost of damage was £15 million.

Work since the flood

Most work took place in the winter season (October–May), during the off-season. The carpark was reduced to half capacity (120 spaces) in winter, for works to take place, and then back to 240 spaces in summer.

2004
August: Buildings searched, buried cars removed from harbour, trees removed, roads cleared, B3263 bridge temporary concrete parapets installed.
20 August: Boscastle Coast Path closed
14 September: Work started on the overflow culvert for the Valency River.
December: Overflow culvert work completed. Also many hard sticks were inserted into the ground so it would create a barrier against the flood.

2005
Early 2005: Most shops and restaurants re-open
 Boscastle power system renewed
 Water supply restored
 Food supply restored
 The flood defences were increased
 Defences improved strongly
 Rebuilding and repairs are mostly finished

2006
30 October: Work on two underground pumping stations for the sewage treatment scheme began.
1 November: Work started to widen and lower the river channel to increase capacity.
December: A new visitor centre opened, in the former Harbour Restaurant, bought by the National Trust.
December: The car park level was raised, and extended, reducing the risk of cars being washed away .

2007
January: Work started on the 'gateway building' next to the car park, to contain toilets, a bus shelter, and information boards.
April: Work stopped on gateway building due to problems with planning permission, and the building being built taller than expected.
21 June: Boscastle reflooded, although it was not nearly as bad as during the 2004 floods.
September: Work restarted on Gateway Building, after planning permission is approved to lower the height of the building
October: Work started on rebuilding an old culvert at the top of the village, to allow more water to flow through in periods of heavy rain.
October: Work started on installing the pipes for the new sewage treatments works, in the harbour area (between the Lower and Upper bridges).
12 November: The main road in the harbour area was closed, from the bridge to the car park, while Cormac started work on new wider pavements, and Carillion installed pipes under the road for the new sewage treatment works.
14 December: The main road in the harbour area was reopened and temporary traffic lights put in place.
18 December: The new lower bridge was installed.

2008
 January: Work on improving the harbour pavements completed. Work on rebuilding the culvert next to the petrol station completed.
 February: Work began on renewing the culvert in Dunn Street, to allow more water through in times of heavy rain.
 March: The Harbour area road was resurfaced. Work on rebuilding the culvert in Dunn Street completed.
 April: Old Lower Bridge was demolished, and the new Lower Bridge was brought into use.

The lower bridge

The main structure of the former lower bridge survived the flood, however the stone walls did not, and were washed away. On 1 May 2005, the official reopening of the village, wooden fences were used on the bridge to temporarily replace the stone walls. The bridge used to have a concrete plaque on it saying "This bridge is the private property of the lord of the manor, August 1887". This was lost during the flood, but then recovered from the harbour in good condition. This bridge has now been replaced with a new one.

During the flood of 2004, 14 cars became lodged beneath it, this had caused a huge backlog of flood water and debris, adding to the damage caused in the surrounding area.

The original proposal was for a stone bridge, this was rejected. The second proposal is for a modern concrete bridge, with steel railings. Public consultations were held and villagers were asked to select their preference from four designs; most did not choose the one which has been proposed. This plan was rejected.

The new bridge is a few metres further down the river than the old bridge. The bridge was installed on 18 December 2007, and was made by Cornish Concrete, a company based near Truro. The main arch is made from reinforced concrete, with metal railings.

The old stone bridge, which was over 100 years old, was demolished in early April 2008.

Mini flood – 21 June 2007
Boscastle flooded again, although not nearly as badly as the 2004 floods. After an afternoon of intense localised rainfall, and a week of steady rain everyday, a small flood happened on 21 June 2007. 30 mm fell on the area in one hour. Roads had become flooded in the area and in the village, most water came from the saturated fields around the village. Many drains had become blocked. Roads around the Tintagel, Camelford and Davidstow area were closed off to stop people visiting the village. River levels were alarmingly high, but the banks contained the water. However the many culverts of the River Jordan had overflowed onto the villages roads, adding to the amount of water on the roads. The new storm culvert joining the River Jordan to the River Valency was at full capacity, but did not flood. Services and organisations called in included:
Fire crews from Bude, Delabole and Launceston to pump out the water from properties
Crews to unblock the blocked up drains in the village
The Environment Agency
The Police and Council
Helicopters from RNAS Culdrose and RMB Chivenor were on stand-by
Boscastle Coast Guard
The Environment Agency's flood defences installed after the 2004 flood worked and kept the water in the river channel. The two main roads (B3266, B3263) were blocked with flood waste and debris, although this was cleared and the roads reopened the following morning. The Environment Agency looked at the culverts around the village and will change them all to modern drainage

See also

List of natural disasters in the United Kingdom

References

Weather statistics for Boscastle area (Met Office, 16 August 2004)
Prince sees Boscastle devastation (BBC News, 18 August 2004)
'Boscastle Flood' (BBC News, 23 August 2004)
Boscastle gets rebuild go-ahead (BBC News, 12 January 2005)
Boscastle's mixed recovery (BBC News, 15 August 2005)
'Ghost town' fears over Boscastle (BBC News, 16 August 2005)
'Boscastle, Flash Flood' (YouTube, added 30 April 2009)
Boscastle flood study findings(Environment Agency, 12 January 2005) 
Boscastle Flood Rescue operation helis.com database operations page
UK Floods-Case studies of causes and effects and flooding policies, Boscastle Flood- 16th August 2004

Geography of Cornwall
Disasters in Cornwall
2004 in England
2004 natural disasters
2004 floods in the United Kingdom
Boscastle
2000s in Cornwall
August 2004 events in the United Kingdom
Boscastle